is a town located in Arida District, Wakayama Prefecture, Japan. , the town had an estimated population of 11,413 in 5338 households and a population density of 550 persons per km2. Yuasa claims to be the birthplace of soy sauce

Geography 
Yuasa is located on the coast in north-central Wakayama Prefecture, facing the Kii Channel. The coastline is a ria coast and the climate is mild due to the effects of the offshore Kuroshio Current.

Neighboring municipalities
Wakayama Prefecture
Arida
Hirogawa
Aridagawa

Climate
Yuasa has a Humid subtropical climate (Köppen Cfa) characterized by warm summers and cool winters with light to no snowfall.  The average annual temperature in Yuasa is 15.7 °C. The average annual rainfall is 1878 mm with September as the wettest month. The temperatures are highest on average in August, at around 26.0 °C, and lowest in January, at around 5.8 °C. The area is subject to typhoons in summer.

Demographics
Per Japanese census data, the population of Yuasa has been slowly declining over the past 40 years.

History
The area of the modern town of Yuasa was within ancient Kii Province. The name "Yuasa" appears in Heian period documents in conjunction with Yuasa Shōen, a landed estate in the area which existed into the Nanboku-chō period. During the Edo period, it was the location of a daikansho which administered the surrounding area for Kishū Domain. The village of Yuasa was established with the creation of the modern municipalities system on April 1, 1889. It was elevated to town status on June 22, 1896. The neighboring village of Tasukawa was annexed on March 31, 1956.

Government
Yuasa has a mayor-council form of government with a directly elected mayor and a unicameral city council of 10 members. Yuasa collectively with the other municipalities of Arida District, contributes three members to the Wakayama Prefectural Assembly. In terms of national politics, the town is part of Wakayama 3rd district of the lower house of the Diet of Japan.

Economy
Yuasa is famous for its soy sauce industry, which has flourished since the Edo period. Commercial fishing, especially for whitebait, agriculture and tourism are all-important contributors to the local economy.

Education
Yuasa has four public elementary schools and one public middle schools operated by the town government, and one public high school operated by the Wakayama Prefectural Board of Education.

Transportation

Railway 
 JR West – Kisei Main Line

Highways 
  Yuasa-Gobo Road

Sister city relations
 - Cambridge, Minnesota, USA, sister cities since March 15, 1986
 - Braham, Minnesota, USA, sister cities since March 15, 1986
 - Kerikeri, New Zealand, sister cities since May 13, 1993

Local attractions
Yuasa old town, designated an Important Preservation District for Traditional Buildings
Mukai-ji, National Historic Site

References

External links

 Yuasa official website 
 CNN Travel Yuasa: Birthplace of Japanese soy sauce and Edo-era treasures.

Towns in Wakayama Prefecture
Yuasa, Wakayama
Populated coastal places in Japan